Perry County is a county in the U.S. state of Kentucky. As of the 2020 census, the population was 28,473. Its county seat is Hazard. The county was founded in 1820. Both the county and county seat are named for Commodore Oliver Hazard Perry, a naval hero in the War of 1812.

History
The area presently bounded by Kentucky state lines was a part of the U.S. State of Virginia, known as Kentucky County when the British colonies separated themselves in the American Revolutionary War. In 1780, Kentucky County was divided into three counties: Fayette, Jefferson, and Lincoln. In 1791, this area was separated into the State of Kentucky; it became effective on June 1, 1792. From that time, the original three counties were divided several times. By 1820, the present Perry County was formed from portions of Floyd and Clay counties. In 1824 the first post office was built on the north fork of the Kentucky River, and was called the Perry Post Office. The first settlers around this area were Elijah Combs, his seven brothers and daughter Jade miller.

The county's economy has long been based on logging and mining coal.

Perry County is home to Hazard Community and Technical College. It is also home to the Hazard ARH Regional Medical Center, a not-for-profit health system operating 10 hospitals, multi-specialty physician practices, home health agencies, HomeCare Stores and retail pharmacies. It is the largest provider of care and single largest employer in southeastern Kentucky and the third largest private employer in southern West Virginia.

Geography

Adjacent counties
 Breathitt County  (north)
 Knott County  (northeast)
 Letcher County  (southeast)
 Harlan County  (south)
 Leslie County  (west)
 Clay County (northwest)
 Owsley County  (northwest)

Demographics 

As of the census of 2000, there were 29,390 people, 11,460 households, and 8,491 families residing in the county. The racial makeup of the county was 97.34% White, 1.64% Black or African American, 0.05% Native American, 0.49% Asian, 0.01% Pacific Islander, 0.04% from other races, and 0.43% from two or more races. 0.52% of the population were Hispanic or Latino of any race.

There were 11,460 households, out of which 34.20% had children under the age of 18 living with them, 56.70% were married couples living together, 13.20% had a female householder with no husband present, and 25.90% were non-families. 23.30% of all households were made up of individuals, and 9.30% had someone living alone who was 65 years of age or older. The average household size was 2.53 and the average family size was 2.98.

In the county, the population was spread out, with 24.40% under the age of 18, 9.10% from 18 to 24, 30.70% from 25 to 44, 24.60% from 45 to 64, and 11.20% who were 65 years of age or older. The median age was 36 years. For every 100 females there were 94.60 males.  For every 100 females age 18 and over, there were 91.30 males.

The median income for a household in the county was $22,089, and the median income for a family was $26,718. Males had a median income of $31,702 versus $20,502 for females. The per capita income for the county was $12,224. About 26.10% of families and 29.10% of the population were below the poverty line, including 36.00% of those under age 18 and 20.60% of those age 65 or over.

Life expectancy
Of 3,142 counties in the United States in 2013, Perry County ranked 3,140 in the life expectancy of both male and female residents. Males in Perry County lived an average of 66.5 years and females lived an average of 73.1 years compared to the national average for longevity of 76.5 for males and 81.2 for females. Moreover, the average longevity in Perry County declined by 0.1 years for males and 2.4 years for females between 1985 and 2013 compared to a national average for the same period of an increased life span of 5.5 years for men and 3.1 years for women. High rates of smoking and obesity and a low level of physical activity appear to be contributing factors to the lowered longevity for both sexes.

Politics

Education

Public
The county has two school districts:

Perry County Schools
This district covers the entire county except for the city of Hazard.

 
 Buckhorn Elementary School
 Buckhorn High School
 
 East Perry Elementary School
 Leatherwood Elementary School
 Perry County Central High School
 Robinson Elementary School
 R.W. Combs Elementary School
 West Perry Elementary School
 Viper Elementary School

Hazard Independent Schools
This district essentially encompasses the city of Hazard. See this link for a more accurate map of the Hazard district boundary.
 Hazard High School
 Hazard Middle School
 Roy G. Eversole Elementary School

Private
 Hazard Christian Academy
 Camden Baker Memorial Schools

Economy

Coal companies in Perry County
 Arch Coal
 James River Coal Company
 TECO Coal

Media

Television
 WYMT-TV
 WKHA-TV, a satellite station of Kentucky Educational Television

Radio
 WSGS
 WKIC
 WJMD
 WEKH, a satellite station of WEKU
 WQXY
 WLZD-LP

Newspapers
 Hazard Herald

Infrastructure

Transportation
Public transportation is provided by LKLP Community Action Partnership with demand-response service and scheduled service in Hazard, and connecting to Hindman, Hyden, and Whitesburg.

Communities

Cities
 Buckhorn
 Hazard (county seat)
 Vicco (part)

Census-designated places
 Combs
 Diablock
 Jeff

Other unincorporated places

 Allais
 Allock
 Ary
 Avawam
 Beehive
 Blue Diamond
 Boat
 Bonnyman
 Bulan
 Busy
 Butterfly
 Chavies
 Christopher
 Clemons
 Combs
 Cornettsville
 Curly Fork
 Daisy
 Darfork
 Defiance
 Delphia
 Dice
 Doorway
 Dow
 Dunraven
 Dwarf
 Eversole
 Farler
 Fourseam
 Fusonia
 Gays Creek
 Glomawr
 Grigsby
 Happy
 Happy Valley
 Hardburly
 Harveyton
 Hilton
 Hiner
 Hurricane
 Johnson
 Jones
 Kodak
 Krypton
 Lamont
 Leatherwood
 Lead Branch
 Little Beech
 Lothair
 Middle Fork
 Miller
 Mudlick
 Napfor
 Olivers
 Otter Creek
 Red Hill
 Rock Fork
 Saul
 Scuddy
 Sixteen
 Slemp
 Stacy
 Tenmile
 Tilford
 Tribbey
 Typo
 Upper Pidgeonroost
 Viper
 Wentz
 Whitaker
 Whitsett
 Woodland Park
 Yerkes

Ghost Towns
 Upper Squabble

Notable residents
 Shelby Lee Adams - American photographer
 Jean Ritchie - Folk singer

See also
 National Register of Historic Places listings in Perry County, Kentucky
 Robinson Forest

References

External links
 Hazard/Perry County Tourism
 Hazard Kentucky and Perry County: A Photographic History
 Hazard Kentucky and Perry County History & Ancestry

 
Kentucky counties
Counties of Appalachia
1820 establishments in Kentucky
Populated places established in 1820